Martín Solar Ruiz (born 30 January 2000) is a Spanish professional footballer who plays as a central midfielder for Club Recreativo Granada.

Club career
Born in Santander, Cantabria, Solar was a Racing de Santander youth graduate. He made his senior debut with the reserves on 25 August 2019, starting in a 1–3 Tercera División away loss against AD Siete Villas.

Solar scored his first senior goal on 26 October 2019, netting the fourth in a 4–0 away routing of UM Escobedo. The following 8 March, he scored a brace in a 7–0 home thrashing of Selaya FC.

Solar made his first team debut on 7 July 2020, coming on as a half-time substitute for Mario Ortiz in a 0–1 loss at CF Fuenlabrada in the Segunda División. On 21 September, he was definitely promoted to the main squad, now in the Segunda División B.

On 3 August 2021, Solar signed a two-year contract with Granada CF, being assigned to the B-team of the Segunda División RFEF.

References

External links

2000 births
Living people
Spanish footballers
Footballers from Santander, Spain
Association football midfielders
Segunda División players
Segunda División B players
Segunda Federación players
Tercera División players
Rayo Cantabria players
Racing de Santander players
Club Recreativo Granada players